Robert Poplawski (born 12 July 1886 in Bordeaux, died 8 August 1953) was a lawyer and a professor at the law faculty in Bordeaux (dean from 1949 till death).

His speciality was penal law, but he also studied and published in the field of the  pharmaceutical law. He published a pharmaceutical law treaty written with his colleagues Frank Coustou and Jean-Marie Auby.

Robert Poplawski has been chosen in 1946 to direct with Dean Henri Vizioz the law institute in Pau with tuitions given by professors from the law faculty of Bordeaux. This institute has given birth thereafter to the law faculty at the University of Pau and Pays de l'Adour and was lodged in Villa Lawrence in Pau town centre.

External links
 La faculté de droit de Bordeaux 1870-1970 By Marc Malherbe on Google book (French)

20th-century French lawyers
Academic staff of the University of Bordeaux
1953 deaths
1886 births